Medomak Valley High School is a public high school established in 1968 in Waldoboro, Maine (Lincoln County), United States, which educates grades 9–12.  The school is part of the MSAD 40 district.

Academics

Medomak Valley offers a variety of core courses and electives.  The school offers AP Level Courses in English Literature, English Language, Human Geography, U.S. Government & Politics, U.S. History, Microeconomics, Macroeconomics, Calculus, Biology, Physics, and Studio Art.  The school also offers a dual enrollment program with Thomas College in which students can earn college credit in a variety of courses including Composition I & II, Literature, Literature & Society, Calculus, Quantitative Analysis, U.S. History, Psychology, Criminal Justice, and Sociology.  Medomak Valley also offers Horticulture courses that support the internationally recognized Medomak Valley Heirloom Seed Project.  The project was listed as a "117 Projects to Watch in 2017" project by foodtank.com.

MVHS Players

The MVHS Players is the drama troupe of Medomak Valley High school. They have performed shows such as: "Bye, Bye, Birdie," "Shrek: The Musical," and "The Addams Family." Their regular productions take place inside of the school year. The Players perform a musical each fall, compete in a regional one act competition in the winter, and put on a "Dessert Theater" performance each spring. The Dessert Theater script is spoken, and does not include musical numbers. Pie is traditionally served during intermission, acquired from Waldoboro's iconic Moody's Diner.

Extracurriculars

In addition to sports, Medomak Valley offers many club opportunities to students.  The school sponsors a National Honors Society, Math Team, Debate Team, Chess Team, Outdoor Club, Gay-Straight Alliance, Ski Club, Environmental Arts and Sciences Club, and Diversity Club.

Notable alumni

 Aaron Robinson (composer) - Composer
 Dana Dow - Politician
 Natasha Irving - District Attorney (first woman elected DA in Maine’s Prosecutorial District No. 6)

Notes

External links
High School Website
District Website

Schools in Lincoln County, Maine
Public high schools in Maine
Waldoboro, Maine